Conviction is an American legal drama television series that aired on NBC as a mid-season replacement from March 3 to May 19, 2006. The cast includes Stephanie March reprising her Law & Order: Special Victims Unit role as Alexandra Cabot. In the series, Cabot returns to New York City and becomes a Bureau Chief ADA supervising a group of young but talented assistant district attorneys after a stint in the Witness Protection Program. Other cast members include Eric Balfour, Anson Mount, Jordan Bridges, Julianne Nicholson, Milena Govich, and J. August Richards.

Prior to the show's debut, creator Dick Wolf remarked, "Conviction will be a 'charactercedural', we will be dealing extensively with characters' back stories and personal lives. I am delighted with the extraordinary cast we have assembled, which will give the show depth and emotional intensity."

Convictions premiere came precisely one year after the premiere of the short-lived Law & Order: Trial by Jury, which was also created by Dick Wolf and also aired on NBC (in filming, Conviction used many of the Trial by Jury sets). On February 21, 2006, the pilot episode of Conviction was made available for free download through iTunes music store; the free download was available until March 3, the date of the NBC premiere. The pilot and all other aired episodes are now available for purchase.

NBC announced the series would not be renewed for a second season on May 14, 2006, having been routinely beaten in the ratings by CBS's math police procedural Numb3rs.

The theme song to Conviction is "Destiny", by the English electronic music group Syntax. It can be found on their 2004 album Meccano Mind.

Cast and characters
 Stephanie March as Alexandra Cabot
 In Conviction, Bureau Chief ADA Cabot is engaged, and has had a fling with Deputy District Attorney Jim Steele, which was alluded to in Episode 5. Since her time as an ADA with the Special Victims Unit (2000–2003), Alex's ideals and the way she does her job have changed, becoming more of a "politician" – something that often angers her staff, particularly Jessica Rossi. During the show's run, it was unexplained why Cabot was able to leave the Witness Protection Program, which she joined in 2003, after her life was threatened by a drug lord whose associate she had tried to prosecute. In a 2009 episode of SVU ("Lead"), in which March guest starred as Alexandra Cabot, it was revealed that the drug lord, Cesar Velez, died in prison, and Liam Connors, an assassin hired by Velez to kill her, was extradited to his native Ireland. No longer in Witness Protection, she had been back in the Manhattan DA's office for the past three years, which accounted for her reappearance on Conviction in 2006.
 Anson Mount as Jim Steele
 Jim Steele is the Deputy Bureau Chief ADA whose best friend, Mike Randolph, is murdered by drug dealers in the pilot episode of Conviction. Jim is strong-willed and determined to avenge his friend's death. He is shown to have an adversarial relationship with Cabot after she decides to plead out his friend's murderer. Jim is tough on his subordinates, but he is secretly proud of them. He is having an affair with Jessica Rossi, which was private until the media exploited it in an attempt by a woman on trial to detract from Steele's credibility and portray him in a negative light. It is also implied that Cabot and Steele had a sexual relationship, as seen in the episode "Savasana".
 Eric Balfour as Brian Peluso
 Brian Peluso is a laid-back and irresponsible ADA that seems to be heavily into partying but is very invested in his clients. He has sex with a number of different women that he does not seem to care about, something that is seen as a defense mechanism because when he does open up to women, they often let him down. Peluso confesses to being in love with Finn in "Hostage". There are subtle references to a potential substance abuse problem, and he has a problem with gambling. He is often seen drinking Red Bull.
 J. August Richards as Billy Desmond
 Billy Desmond is smart, politically motivated, and hasn't lost a case during his three years at the DA's office. Initially, he appears to care more about winning cases and his political stature, but over the course of the first season, it became evident that Billy will not compromise the law or the DA's office for either his track record or his aspirations. Billy appears to be closest to Finn and Peluso, who he is seen to go out with after hours, but he also has hit a club or two with new co-worker, Potter.
 Milena Govich as Jessica Rossi
 Jessica Rossi is a young ADA who comes from a poor family. In the pilot episode, she is shown fighting with her brother after he asks her for a loan. We learn later that Jessica's father is abusive to her mother and has been for a long time. She is a fierce and often unrelenting ADA who frequently goes over her bosses' heads and takes big risks to punish the criminals she prosecutes. Jessica, along with Christina Finn, is particularly affected by the death of Mike Randolph. She is having an affair with her superior, Jim Steele. Jessica mentions to Christina that she lost her first court case.
 Julianne Nicholson as Christina Finn
 Christina Finn is an inexperienced ADA who has been with the DA's office for two years. She is particularly nervous about her first case, to the point that she becomes physically ill. Her first case, along with the death of her mentor, Mike Randolph, take a toll on Christina, although in the end she wins her case. Though she has limited trial experience, she is a quick learner, and despite some mistakes, she shows great proficiency. While sitting second chair to Steele in a murder trial, she convinces him that it is necessary that he allow for her to give the closing argument, else they would be certain to lose, due to the fact that the defendant had reverted to numerous means of undermining Steele throughout the trial.  Her closing argument wins them the trial. Christina is flirtatious with Brian Peluso.
 Jordan Bridges as Nick Potter
 Nick Potter is a new and inexperienced ADA. He graduated in the middle of his class from New York University (NYU) Law School, and he comes from an "old money" family of prominence. In the pilot episode, he leaves his high-paying job at a private law firm, Cromwell Moore, for a position at the Manhattan District Attorney's Office. Nick is apparently attracted to Jessica Rossi; however, she is having an affair with Jim Steele. Nick is an idealist who wants to help those around him in whatever way he can, but his idealism and naïveté put him at odds with Steele's more aggressive and assertive nature. Nick is inadvertently responsible for the death of Jim's best friend, Mike Randolph. Although nobody else in the office believes Nick will last more than three months, Jessica Rossi has confidence in him and takes him under her wing. Since he is the new guy, he is also the target of pranks by the other members of the office (one that had him put a dress on to help finish up a hoax line up). Nick is the victim of a robbery, where he is brutally beaten, and the event haunts him to the point where his professionalism is brought into question.

Episodes

Ratings

Cancellation and aftermath
Conviction lost all of its Friday night ratings battles to CBS' Numb3rs. The last minute addition of Alexandra Cabot resulted in what was perceived as an unflattering and out-of-character portrayal. Also, despite Dick Wolf's claim of keeping the story character driven and giving detailed backgrounds, much of Cabot's character was not developed or explained.

The cancellation also came as the second legal drama failure for Dick Wolf, the first being Law & Order: Trial by Jury. Coincidentally, the show reused several of TBJs sets.

Conviction averaged 7.7 million viewers overall (placing 73 for the season), 2.5 mill. in the 18–49 demo (placing 86), and 8 share.  In contrast, the competing show, Numb3rs, averaged 11.7 million viewers overall (placing 31), 3.3 mill. in the 18–49 demo (placing 56), and 10 share.

Nevertheless, two actresses from the series have moved on to become lead characters in other Law & Order series. Milena Govich appeared on the original Law & Order as Det. Nina Cassady in its 17th season, having first appeared on Law & Order as a guest star in 2005. Julianne Nicholson, who played the meek Christina Finn, appears as Megan Wheeler on Law & Order: Criminal Intent.  Nicholson had previously guest starred on the original Law & Order in the episode "All My Children" in 2001.

Broadcast history

Overseas broadcasts
Conviction has aired on Five US and Hallmark Channel in the United Kingdom. In March 2008, the show debuted in Australia, on Network Ten's Ten HD channel.

Re-runs
Re-runs were shown on the now defunctant Universal HD and are currently shown on Hulu in the United States.

DVD release

References

External links

Conviction on episodelist.com

2006 American television series debuts
2006 American television series endings
2000s American crime drama television series
2000s American legal television series
English-language television shows
Law & Order (franchise)
NBC original programming
Television series by Universal Television
American television spin-offs
Television shows set in New York City
Television series created by Dick Wolf
Television series by Wolf Films
Television series about prosecutors